Sugar Creek Township is one of twelve townships in Boone County, Indiana. As of the 2010 census, its population was 2,243 and it contained 919 housing units.

Geography
The township is named for the Sugar Creek.

Cities and towns
 Thorntown

Adjacent townships
 Jefferson (south)
 Washington (east)
 Franklin Township, Montgomery County (southwest)
 Jackson Township, Clinton County (northeast)
 Perry Township, Clinton County (north)

Major highways
  U.S. Route 52
  Indiana State Road 47
  Indiana State Road 75

Cemeteries
The township contains seven cemeteries: Gipson, Sugar Plain, Old Cemetery, Walnut Grove, Green, Curry and Maple Lawn.

References
 United States Census Bureau cartographic boundary files
 U.S. Board on Geographic Names

External links

 Indiana Township Association
 United Township Association of Indiana

Townships in Boone County, Indiana
Townships in Indiana